Puerto Rico Highway 487 (PR-487) is a north–south road located entirely in the municipality of Hatillo, Puerto Rico.

Major intersections

See also

 List of highways numbered 487

References

External links
 

487
Hatillo, Puerto Rico